Khairil Izwan bin Pilus (24 November 1979 – 21 January 2012) was a Malaysian singer and television host. He is known for his songs Kembali Senyum and Indah Lelapku.

Personal life
Born in Kuala Lumpur, Izwan is the older brother of fellow artist Aril. His family originated from Taman Nyalas Permai, Jasin.

Death 
Pilus contracted leptospirosis and died on 21 January 2012 at Ampang Hospital, Selangor. His death was reported on Twitter by his brother, Khairil Azam Pilus.

He was buried in Kampung Pelembang Islam Cemetery in Jasin.

Album 
 Erti Kasih (Mean of Heart), 2006

References

External links 
 Izwan Pilus meninggal dunia, Sinar Harian, 
 Singer Izwan Pilus buried in Jasin
 Singer Izwan Pilus dies of blood infection

Malaysian male pop singers
1979 births
2012 deaths
Malaysian rhythm and blues singers
Malaysian people of Malay descent
Malaysian Muslims